Darren Walsh (born 27 December 1984) is a former Australian rules footballer who played for Essendon in the Australian Football League (AFL).

He was drafted by the Essendon Football Club in the 2002 National draft at pick 27 in the second round. He played two games in his first season with Essendon but ended the season with glandular fever. Walsh was delisted after the 2004 season without having played another game.

References

External links
 

Essendon Football Club players
1984 births
Living people
Australian rules footballers from Victoria (Australia)
Sandringham Dragons players
Bendigo Football Club players